Dayr Hafir ( / ALA-LC: Dayr Ḥāfir) is a Syrian city in the Aleppo Governorate,  east of Aleppo on the Aleppo-Raqqa highway,  to the north of Sabkhat al-Jabbul. It is the regional centre of Dayr Hafir District. In the 2004 official census, the town of Dayr Hafir had a population of 18,948. The town is home to an archeological site dating back to the 9th millennium BC.

Dayr Hafir is still a rural community in its majority.

During the Syrian Civil War, in June 2012, the government was reported to be in control of this town that is close to a military airport (Kweiris). The city came under the control of the Islamic State of Iraq and the Levant in 2014, before being retaken by Syrian Government forces during the Dayr Hafir offensive in 2017.

References

Cities in Syria
Populated places in Dayr Hafir District